

339001–339100 

|-bgcolor=#f2f2f2
| colspan=4 align=center | 
|}

339101–339200 

|-bgcolor=#f2f2f2
| colspan=4 align=center | 
|}

339201–339300 

|-id=223
| 339223 Stongemorin ||  || Gilbert St-Onge (born 1955) and Lorraine Morin (born 1944), a Canadian amateur astronomical family with outreach and scientific contributions || 
|}

339301–339400 

|-bgcolor=#f2f2f2
| colspan=4 align=center | 
|}

339401–339500 

|-id=486
| 339486 Raimeux ||  || Mont Raimeux, a mountain in the Jura range of Switzerland || 
|}

339501–339600 

|-bgcolor=#f2f2f2
| colspan=4 align=center | 
|}

339601–339700 

|-bgcolor=#f2f2f2
| colspan=4 align=center | 
|}

339701–339800 

|-bgcolor=#f2f2f2
| colspan=4 align=center | 
|}

339801–339900 

|-id=855
| 339855 Kedainiai ||  || Kėdainiai is one of the oldest cities in Lithuania. It is located near the geographical center of the Lithuanian Republic about 50 km north of Kaunas on the banks of the Nevezis River. First mentioned in the 1372 Livonian Chronicle, its current population is about 24 000. || 
|}

339901–340000 

|-bgcolor=#f2f2f2
| colspan=4 align=center | 
|}

References 

339001-340000